Off His Rockers is an animated short film produced by Walt Disney Feature Animation and released in 1992. It was released theatrically accompanying the film Honey, I Blew Up the Kid. It was the first Disney animated short film to use digital ink and paint via CAPS process. The short was included on the laserdisc release of Honey, I Blew Up the Kid. It has not received any other home video release.

Plot 
A boy plays a video game on a console, ignoring everything around him. His wooden horse, with which he used to play, tries to make him regain his desire to play with him by doing things such as a two-legged dance, but to no avail. The horse unintentionally unplugs the video game, so the boy angrily turns it back on. However, the boy sees a picture of him with the horse on the ground and regains his desire to play with him. Thus, the child plays cowboys with the horse, riding around the room with him.

Credits

Staff 
 Director: Barry Cook
 Producer: Tad Gielow
 Music: Bruce Broughton
 Film Editor: Chuck Williams
 Art Director: Ric Sluiter
 Supervising Animators: Rob Bekuhrs, James R. Tooley, Alex Kupershmidt
 Animators: Tom Bancroft, Linda Bel, Paul McDonald
 Story Development: Barry Cook, Paul Steele, Peter Cook, Alex Kupershmidt
 Visual Development: Tony Bancroft, Rob Bekuhrs, Lou Dellarosa, Trey Finney, Levi Lewis, Steve Goldberg
 Layout Sketch: Bob Walker, Davy Liu
 Background Paintings: Kevin Turcotte, Robert Stanton
 Animation Check: Laurie Scaks
 Animation Camera: Mary E. Lescher, Gary W. Smith
 Digital Film Recording: Ariel Shaw, Christopher Gee, Chuck Warren, Christine Beck
 Florida Animation Studio Ink & Paint: Fran Kirsten, Pam Darley, Suzie Ewing, Mike Lusby, Monica Murdock, Lynn Rippberger, Joanne Tzuanos
 Digitizing Camera: Robyn Roberts, Jo Ann Breuer, Karen China, Bob Cohen, Lynnette Cullen, Gareth  Fishbaugh, Cindy Garcia, Kent Gordon, Gina Wootten
 Production Management: Tim O'Donnell, David F. Wolf, Suzi Vissotzky
 Sound Design: Drew Neumann
 CG Production System Coordinator: Don Gworek
 CG Systems Administration: Brad Lowman, Michael Bolds, Carlos Quinonez, Grace Shirado, Michael Sullivan, Mark M. Tokunaga
 Computer Rendering on: Silicon Graphics Computer Systems
 Computer Graphics Software: Wavefront Technologies
 Special Thanks: Wendy Aylsworth, Paul Curasi, Joe Jiuliano, Dan Philips, Maureen Donley
 Animation Production Services Provided: Walt Disney Animation Florida, Disney/MGM Studios, Lake Buena Vista, Florida

Creation process 
The film started as a side project of director Barry Cook, who, at the time, was working at Walt Disney Animation Florida. Starting with a core of six people, the project ended up involving most of the Florida studio's staff of 73 (and some in California), all of whom "donated" their time to the project beyond their official duties.

References

External links 

 

1992 animated films
1992 films
1990s Disney animated short films
Films scored by Bruce Broughton
Films directed by Barry Cook
Animated films without speech